Family Plan may refer to:
 The Family Plan, an American action-comedy film from Skydance Media.
 Family Plan (2005 film), an American television comedy film
 Family Plan (1997 film), an American comedy film
 Family Plan (American Dad!)